Geastrum rufescens, commonly known as the rosy earthstar, is a species of fungus in the family Geastraceae. It was first described scientifically by Christian Hendrik Persoon in 1801. It has a pale pinkish-buff to pinkish exoperidium and rays. The earthstar is found in Europe, North America (including Mexico), and Japan, where it typically grows at the base of old oak stumps.

References

rufescens
Inedible fungi
Fungi described in 1801
Fungi of Asia
Fungi of Europe
Fungi of North America
Taxa named by Christiaan Hendrik Persoon